Sellaband was a music website that allowed artists to raise the money from their fans and the SellaBand community in order to record a professional album. Sellaband used the mechanisms of crowdfunding and was to be seen as a Direct-to-Fan/fan-funded music platform utilising a Threshold Pledge System / Provision Point Mechanism. It was set up by Johan Vosmeijer (ex Sony/BMG), Pim Betist (ex Shell), and Dagmar Heijmans (ex Sony/BMG) in August 2006. Its offices used to be located in Amsterdam, Netherlands, but it was originally incorporated in Bocholt, Germany.

On April 8, 2008, Sellaband raised EU€3.5 million (US$5 million) in their Series A round led by Prime Technology Ventures.

In early 2009, Pim Betist left Sellaband to set up Africa Unsigned, using Sellaband technology as a base and supported by the Dutch government.

In January 2010, Sellaband filed for bankruptcy. It relaunched days later, after an investor stepped forward. The office was relocated to Munich, Germany. On August 28, 2015, the Sellaband GmbH filed for bankruptcy, too. This was rejected because of lack of mass by the District Court Charlottenburg on January 12, 2016.

For three years, Sellaband supported the sharing of revenue, a form of equity crowdfunding. Research from the Journal of Economics & Management Strategy examined investment data on the Sellaband platform during this time period. The data shows that, while investments can come from funders around the world, distance continues to affect the flow of funding and information.

Events

Sellaband conducted three official concerts in Europe.
 "New Years Party" (January 2007), the Paradiso, Amsterdam, NL
 "London Calling" (June 2007), Gibson Studios, London, UK
 "Sellabration - Birthday Party" (August 15, 2007 & 2008), the Paradiso, Amsterdam, NL

Artists who reached their goal
86 artists reached their fundraising goal.  In December 2009 Cubworld was the first artist, closing his second budget. Less than two weeks after bankruptcy, Aryn Michelle  was the first artist, closing her budget under the new SellaBand-management. In October 2010 Epyllion closed the first budget on Sellaband that was not used for recording new but for promoting of already released music.

Upon closure of the site, there were over 700 artists registered on Sellaband raising funds.

The following table shows the most notable artists that reached their funding goal on SellaBand:

See also
 Comparison of crowd funding services
 Crowdsourcing
 Music 2.0
 Netlabel
 Social commerce
 Web 2.0

References

 BBC Radio 2 Interview (The Weekender with Matthew Wright - 3 November 2006)
 The Times (UK): Knowledge Section (26 November 2006)

External links
 Official website (offline)

Companies established in 2006
Crowdfunding platforms of the Netherlands
German independent record labels
Netlabels
Online music stores of the Netherlands